Read Mountains is a group of rocky summits, the highest Holmes Summit 1,875 m, lying east of Glen Glacier in the south-central part of the Shackleton Range. First mapped in 1957 by the Commonwealth Trans-Antarctic Expedition and named for Professor Herbert H. Read, Chairman of the Scientific Committee and member of the Committee of Management of the Commonwealth Trans-Antarctic Expedition, 1955–58.

Features
Geographical features include:

Du Toit Nunataks

Other features

 Arkell Cirque
 Beche Blade
 Bowen Cirque
 Eskola Cirque
 Flett Crags
 Glen Glacier
 Goldschmidt Cirque
 Holmes Summit
 Kuno Cirque
 Lapworth Cirque
 Mantell Screes
 Mount Wegener
 Murchison Cirque
 Nicol Crags
 Niggli Nunataks
 Strachey Stump
 Swinnerton Ledge
 The Ark
 Trueman Terraces
 Watts Needle

References 

Mountain ranges of Coats Land